This are the results of 2015 BWF World Senior Championships' 40+ events.

Medalist

Men's singles

Seeds

 Peter Rasmussen (champion, gold medal)
 Fernando Silva (semifinals, bronze medal)
 Mario Carulla (withdrew)
 Carsten Loesch (fourth round)
 Fabrice Bernabé (quarterfinals)
 Marc Götze (second round)
 Dharma Gunawi (quarterfinals)
 Gregers Schytt (semifinals, bronze medal)
 Fredrik Bohlin (fourth round)
 Jürgen Koch (final, silver medal)
 Sergey Makin (second round)
 Daniel Plant (fourth round)
 Vijay Sharma (fourth round)
 Tajuya Yamamoto (fourth round)
 Hendrady Perdana (second round)
 Andreas Schlüter (fourth round)

Finals

Top half

Section 1

Section 2

Section 3

Section 4

Bottom half

Section 5

Section 6

Section 7

Section 8

Women's singles

Seeds

 Atsuko Matsuguma (second round)
 Reni Hassan (quarterfinals)
 Michaela Meyer (quarterfinals)
 Nilofar Mosavar Rahmani (second round)

Finals

Top half

Section 1

Section 2

Bottom half

Section 3

Section 4

Men's doubles

Seeds

 Hariyanto Arbi / Tri Kusharjanto (champions, gold medal)
 Peter Rasmussen / Thomas Stavngaard (final, silver medal)
 Carl Jennings / Mark King (semifinals, bronze medal)
 Dharma Gunawi /  Jürgen Koch (semifinals, bronze medal)
 Jens Eriksen / Gregers Schytt (quarterfinals)
 Martin Hagberg / Erik Sjöstedt (quarterfinals)
 Wittaya Panomchai / Naruthum Surakkhaka (second round)
 Mario Carulla /  Fernando Silva (withdrew)

Finals

Top half

Section 1

Section 2

Bottom half

Section 3

Section 4

Women's doubles

Seeds

 Tracey Middleton / Joanne Muggeridge (semifinals, bronze medal)
 Gondáné Fórián Csilla /  Reni Hassan (final, silver medal)
 Olga Bryant / Karina Bye (third round)
 Marielle van der Woerdt / Georgy Van Soerland-Trouerbach (quarterfinals)
 Dorota Danielak / Dorota Grzejdak (quarterfinals)
 Michael Hukriede / Stefanie Ruberg (semifinals, bronze medal)
 Anna Larsen / Marianne Simon (quarterfinals)
 Christina Rindshøj / Dorte Steenberg (second round)

Finals

Top half

Section 1

Section 2

Bottom half

Section 3

Section 4

Mixed doubles

Seeds

 Paul Mitchell / Karina Bye (second round)
 Kei Hamaji / Mie Hanyu (quarterfinals)
 Daniel Plant / Tracey Middleton (quarterfinals)
 Erik Sjöstedt / Nilofar Mosavar Rahmani (final, silver medal)
 Carsten Loesch / Dorte Steenberg (champions, gold medal)
 Jochen Zepmeisel / Tanja Eberl (second round)
 Carl Jennings / Joanne Muggeridge (semifinals, bronze medal)
 Raja Kumar Gattupalli / Usha Sree Peddisetty (second round)

Finals

Top half

Section 1

Section 2

Bottom half

Section 3

Section 4

References

2015 BWF World Senior Championships